Lindean railway station served the village of Lindean, Scottish Borders, Scotland, from 1856 to 1964 on the Selkirk and Galashiels Railway.

History 
The station was opened on 5 April 1856 by the Selkirk and Galashiels Railway. To the west was Lindean Mill and to the east were two sidings. The level crossing was controlled by a ground frame. A few yards away from the platform was the stationmaster's house and behind the platform was a railway cottage. The station closed to passengers on 10 September 1951 but remained open for goods traffic. It was downgraded to an unstaffed public delivery siding on 13 September 1954. The platform was reduced to a mound and was demolished in 1961. The station closed to goods on 23 May 1964.

References 

Disused railway stations in the Scottish Borders
Railway stations in Great Britain opened in 1856
Railway stations in Great Britain closed in 1951
1856 establishments in Scotland
1964 disestablishments in Scotland